A conceit is an extended metaphor, especially in literature.

Conceit may also refer to:
 Conceit (novel) (2007), by Mary Novik
 Conceit (rapper) (fl. c. 2007), American musician
 Conceit (film), a 1921 American silent drama film
 Excessive self-esteem, hubris

See also 
 Central conceit, a literary work's inherent assumption, toward which its audience are intended to suspend disbelief